Ryan Pugh (born December 4, 1988) is an American football coach and former player who is currently the offensive coordinator at Abilene Christian.  Previously, he was the offensive line coach and, before that, the offensive line coach and running game coordinator at Southern. Before going to Southern, he was most recently the offensive coordinator and offensive line coach at Troy. Pugh was a prominent center for the Auburn Tigers of Auburn University; selected All-Southeastern Conference in 2010. He is married to Cathey Lee (Dalton) Pugh.

References

External links
 Abilene Christian profile

1988 births
Living people
American football centers
Abilene Christian Wildcats football coaches
Auburn Tigers football coaches
Auburn Tigers football players
BYU Cougars football coaches
Cincinnati Bearcats football coaches
LSU Tigers football coaches
Southern Jaguars football coaches
Troy Trojans football coaches
UTSA Roadrunners football coaches
Virginia Tech Hokies football coaches
People from Hoover, Alabama
Coaches of American football from Alabama
Players of American football from Alabama